The International Brazilian Jiu-Jitsu Federation (IBJJF) is a for-profit company that hosts several of the biggest Brazilian jiu-jitsu (BJJ) tournaments in the world, including the World Jiu-Jitsu Championship, World No-Gi Championship, Pan Jiu-Jitsu Championship, and European Open Jiu-Jitsu Championship. The federation was created by Carlos Gracie, Jr., who is the head of one of the largest Brazilian jiu-jitsu associations, Gracie Barra. The IBJJF uses the ruleset of the Confederação Brasileira de Jiu-Jitsu. On October 11, 2020, the IBJJF announced that they will begin to allow both heel hooks and knee-reaping for all brown and black belts competing in no-gi tournaments, starting on an undisclosed date in 2021.

IBJJF Gi tournaments 

Athletes competing in official IBJJF tournaments can gain ranking points which count towards their position in the official IBJJF rankings. In the 2017–2018 points system first place in weight divisions is worth 9 points, second 3 points, and third 1 point. First place in the open class is worth 13.5 points, second 4.5 points, and third 1.5 points.

The IBJJF weight tournaments in terms of their importance in the calendar. The weighting of a tournament is a factor in the calculation of the number of points the athlete can win via their participation. The IBJJF also uses a third criterion for determining ranking points, which is the calendar season the tournament took place. For the 2017/2018 season, ranking points gained at an IBJJF event from 2015/16 were multiplied by 1, 2016/2017 by 2, and 2017/2018 by 3.

Points are calculated as follows:

Number of points x tournament ranking × year weighting

Examples:

2017/2018 World Championship 1st place open division 13.5 for first x 7 tournament ranking x 3 season weighting = 283.5 points
2015/2016 British National 2nd place medium heavy division 3 for second x 1 tournament ranking x 1 season weighting = 3 points

The Gi tournaments in the 2017/2018 season along with their tournament weighting are listed below.

IBJJF No-Gi Tournaments 

As of December 2017, the IBJJF does not have a separate athlete ranking for No-Gi tournaments although states on its ranking page that "No-GI ranking and system coming soon". The No-Gi events in the 2017/2018 calendar are listed below.

See also
 IBJJF weight classes

References

External links 
 

Brazilian jiu-jitsu organizations
Sports organizations established in 2002
International sports organizations
International Brazilian Jiu-Jitsu Federation